Catherine Neilson (born 3 October 1957) is a British stage, television and film actress, who was active from the late 1970s to the mid-1990s.

Career
On stage, Neilson starred as Christie in Traps by Caryl Churchill, at the Royal Court Theatre Upstairs in London, opposite Tim Pigott-Smith, in 1977. The Spectator observed that the role was "superbly played by Catherine Neilson". In 1980, she was Anni in Make and Break by Michael Frayn in the West End at the Theatre Royal Haymarket. And in 1985 she starred at the National Theatre as Val in Neaptide by Sarah Daniels.

On television, Neilson's early starring roles include the two-season series Yanks Go Home (1976–1977), and Czech Mate, one of the 13 teleplays of the Hammer House of Mystery and Suspense (1985). In 1988 she was Ian Charleson's love interest in the espionage miniseries Codename: Kyril. On the Ruth Rendell Mysteries, she played Elizabeth Nightingale in A Guilty Thing Surprised (1988).

Neilson continued her television success with a starring role in Small Zones, a teleplay for Screen Two (1990), and she was a cast member of the crime series Yellowthread Street (1990). She also starred in two films by Ken Russell: The Strange Affliction of Anton Bruckner (1990), and Prisoner of Honor (1991). In 1993 she was in the main cast of the made-for-television thriller film Thicker than Water.

In feature films, Neilson had supporting and co-starring roles. These include, most notably, Lady June Carberry in White Mischief (1987) and Irene Saunders in Clint Eastwood's White Hunter Black Heart (1990).

Filmography

Film
 Firepower (1979) - Hotel Secretary
 The Wicked Lady (1983) - Customer in Shop
 Biggles: Adventures in Time (1986) - Young Nun
 White Mischief (1987) - Lady June Carberry
 White Hunter Black Heart (1990) - Irene Saunders
 The Trial (1993) - Washer Woman

Television
 Warship (1976) - Rita Kersey
 Yanks Go Home (1976–1977) - Doreen Sankey
 Coronation Street (1979) - Karen Barnes
 World's End (1981) - Lynn
 Widows (1983, TV Mini-Series) - Trudie Nunn
 Mr. Palfrey of Westminster (1984) - Anna Capek
 Hammer House of Mystery and Suspense (1985) - Marie Vladekova
 Widows 2 (1985, TV Mini-Series) - Trudie Nunn
 London's Burning (1988) - Nicola McQueen
 Codename: Kyril (1988, TV Mini-Series) - Emma
 Ruth Rendell Mysteries (1988) - Elizabeth Nightingale
 Wipe Out (miniseries) (1988, TV Mini-Series) - Mika Reynolds
 Bergerac (1989) - Jennifer Sutton
 Small Zones (Screen Two, 1990) - Jenny
 Yellowthread Street (1990) - Det. Kelly Lang
 Casualty (1990) - Emma Lawrence
 The Strange Affliction of Anton Bruckner (1990, TV Movie) - Grete
 Prisoner of Honour (1991, TV Movie) - Eloise
 Perfect Scoundrels (1992) - Freestone
 Thicker than Water (1993, TV Movie) - Chloe (final film role)

References
Screen International Film and TV Year Book, Volume 39. Screen International, King Publications, 1984. p. 606.

Notes

External links

British television actresses
British film actresses
British stage actresses
Living people
1957 births